The Maritime Security Patrol Area (MSPA) is a specified patrol zone in the Gulf of Aden and Guardafui Channel.  Its borders are unmarked, but are a narrow, rectangular corridor between Somalia and Yemen, within the northern sector of the gulf. The MSPA was established 22 August 2008 by the Combined Task Force 150, (CTF-150) a multinational, coalition naval task force in order to deter de-stabilizing activities, including piracy within this maritime geographical area.  The establishment of the MSPA was directed by the Commander, United States Naval Central Command.

See also
 Piracy in Somalia

References

External links
 Map of the Area
 The Cost of Doing Business on the Open Sea by Richard Pollak, The Nation, April 22, 2009

Gulf of Aden
Piracy in Somalia
Military units and formations established in 2008
War on terror
Maritime boundaries